The  is the strait at the narrowest part of the Bungo Channel in Japan.

References

Straits of Japan
Landforms of Ehime Prefecture
Landforms of Ōita Prefecture